Acrostichum aureum, the golden leather fern, is a large species of fern that grows in mangrove swamps and other wet locations. Other common names include swamp fern and mangrove fern.

Description
The golden leather fern has large fronds growing to a length of 1.8 metres (six feet). The leaves are glossy, broad and pinnate, the pinnae being dark green, leathery, alternate and widely spaced. The outer fronds arch over sideways but the central ones are nearly straight. Some of the larger fronds bear sporangia (reproductive organs) on the upper five to eight pairs of pinnae. These are brick red and give the pinnae a felted appearance.

Distribution and habitat
The golden leather fern is found in tropical and sub-tropical areas around the world. It grows in swamps and mangrove forests, salt marshes and on river banks and is tolerant of raised salinity levels. The spores germinate better, however, in fresh water. It tends to grow on slight elevations in the mangrove swamp in areas which are inundated by the sea occasionally. It can also grow in freshwater locations. In Malaysia there are two plant forms. The larger ones occur on the periphery of the swamp where they may reach  while much more stunted plants grow in the areas which are frequently inundated. It can grow in full sun or in deep shade and it has been found that the mangrove Rhizophora mucronata can regenerate in dense stands of the fern.

Status
The IUCN Red List of Threatened Species lists the golden leather fern as being of "Least Concern"" because it is common, is fast growing, regenerates easily and has few threats. It grows vigorously in disturbed areas of mangrove forest and may be difficult to eradicate.

Uses
In Cambodia, where the fern is known as prâng' tük (prâng'''="cycad", tük''="aquatic", Khmer language), the young leaves are eaten in salads.

In the Indian state of Goa the fern is consumed cooked in a spicy coconut based gravy known as tonak. It is considered a delicacy by the local people.

Cultivation
Golden leather fern can be grown under high light in garden soil or potting mix, if the substrate is kept constantly wet. Ordinary fresh water (not brackish water) is sufficient for cultivation.

References

External links
Acrostichum aureum occurrence data from GBIF

aureum
Edible plants
Ferns of Asia
Ferns of Oceania
Flora of Africa
Flora of Mexico
Flora of the Northern Territory
Flora of Queensland
Flora of South America
Flora of South-Central China
Flora of Southeast China
Flora of the Tubuai Islands
Flora of tropical Asia
Plants described in 1753
Taxa named by Carl Linnaeus